Anthony Jared Zerbe (born May 20, 1936) is an American actor. His notable film roles include the post-apocalyptic cult leader Matthias in The Omega Man, a 1971 film adaptation of Richard Matheson's 1954 novel, I Am Legend; as an Irish Catholic coal miner and one of the Molly Maguires in the 1970 film The Molly Maguires; as a corrupt gambler in Farewell, My Lovely; as the leper colony chief Toussaint in the 1973 historical drama prison film Papillon; as Abner Devereaux in Kiss Meets the Phantom of the Park; as villain Milton Krest in the James Bond film Licence to Kill; Rosie in The Turning Point; Roger Stuart in The Dead Zone; Admiral Dougherty in Star Trek: Insurrection; and Councillor Hamann in The Matrix Reloaded and The Matrix Revolutions.

Life and career
Zerbe was born in Long Beach, California, the son of Catherine (née Scurlock) and Arthur LeVan Zerbe. He went to Newport Harbor High School. He attended Pomona College in Claremont, California, graduating in 1958. His parents were also alumni of Pomona College. He served in the United States Air Force from 1959 to 1961.

Zerbe's interest in acting was kindled by stage productions when he was 17. He studied at the Stella Adler Studio in New York City. He made his New York City stage debut at the Greenwich Mews Theatre on October 15, 1961 with The Cave Dwellers. On television, he has played guest roles on such series as Naked City, The Virginian, Kung Fu (2 episodes), The Big Valley, Route 66, The Wild Wild West, Twelve O'Clock High, Bonanza, Mission: Impossible (5 episodes), Gunsmoke, Hawaii Five-O, Mannix (4 episodes), It Takes a Thief, The Chisholms, Ironside, The F.B.I., The Rookies, The Rockford Files, Dynasty, Columbo, as well as numerous others.

Zerbe had a starring role in The Young Riders. He co-starred on Harry O from the second half of the first season through the series conclusion at the end of the second season. He was also seen as Pontius Pilate in the miniseries A.D. and as General Grant in North and South: Book II. He appeared in many episodes of the mini-series Centennial, in 1978. In 2013, he played Senator Horton Mitchell in American black comedy/crime film American Hustle. He was Mr. Crumwald in the 2014 Hungarian-American film, Six Dance Lessons in Six Weeks.

Zerbe is the former artistic director of Reflections, A New Plays Festival at the Geva Theatre in Rochester, New York, and toured the United States, in 1981, with Behind the Broken Words, a performance of contemporary poetry, comedy, and dramatic works with fellow actor Roscoe Lee Browne.

In 1976, Zerbe won an Emmy Award for Outstanding Continuing Performance by a Supporting Actor in a Drama Series for his role as Lieutenant K.C. Trench in the private detective series Harry O. In 1981, he played eldest brother Benjamin Hubbard in a Broadway revival of The Little Foxes.

Personal life
Zerbe has been married to Arnette Jens (sister of actress Salome Jens), since October 7, 1962; the couple has two children.

Selected filmography
 1967 Cool Hand Luke as "Dog Boy"
 1967 Will Penny as "Dutchy"
 1970 The Molly Maguires as Dougherty
 1970 The Liberation of L.B. Jones as Willie Joe Worth
 1970 They Call Me Mister Tibbs! as Rice Weedon
 1971 The Omega Man as Jonathan Matthias
 1972 The Hound of the Baskervilles (TV Movie) as Dr. John Mortimer
 1972 The Strange Vengeance of Rosalie as Fry
 1972 The Life and Times of Judge Roy Bean as The Hustler
 1973 Papillon as Toussaint
 1973 She Lives! (TV Movie) as "Dr. W"
 1973 Carola (TV Movie) as Campan
 1973 The Laughing Policeman as Steiner
 1974 The Parallax View as Professor Nelson Schwartzkopf (uncredited)
 1975 Farewell, My Lovely as Laird Brunette
 1975 Rooster Cogburn as "Breed"
 1977 The Turning Point as Rosie
 1978 Child of Glass (TV movie)
 1978 Who'll Stop the Rain as Antheil
 1978 Kiss Meets the Phantom of the Park as Abner Devereaux
 1980 Attica (TV Movie) as William Kunstler
 1980 The First Deadly Sin as Captain Broughton
 1981 Soggy Bottom, U.S.A. as Morgan
 1983 Return of the Man from U.N.C.L.E. as Justin Sepheran
 1983 The Dead Zone as Roger Stuart
 1986 Off Beat as Mr. Wareham
 1986 Opposing Force as Becker
 1987 P.I. Private Investigations as Charles Bradley, Joey's Father
 1987 Steel Dawn as Damnil
 1989 Listen to Me as Senator McKellar
 1989 See No Evil, Hear No Evil as Sutherland
 1989 Licence to Kill as Milton Krest
 1997 Touch as Father Donahue
 1998 Star Trek: Insurrection as Admiral Matthew Dougherty
 1999 True Crime as Henry Lowenstein
 2003 Behind the Broken Words
 2003 The Matrix Reloaded as Councillor Hamann
 2003 The Matrix Revolutions as Councillor Hamann
 2007 Veritas, Prince of Truth as Porterfield
 2013 American Hustle as Senator Horton Mitchell
 2014 Six Dance Lessons in Six Weeks as Mr. Crumwald
 2016 The Investigation as Ash

Television

Naked City (TV series) (1963) – Phil Karshow
The Big Valley (TV series) (1965) - S1 Ep 13 - "The Curse of Matt Bentall"
The Wild Wild West (1967) – Deke Montgomery
The Virginian (1968) – Jake Powell
Gunsmoke (3 episodes, 1968–1973) – Talbot / Heraclio Cantrell and Father Hernando Cantrell / Nick Skouras
Mission: Impossible: "The Photographer" (1967) – David Redding
Mission: Impossible: "Live Bait" (1969) – Colonel Helmut Kellerman
Mission: Impossible: "The Amnesiac" (1969) – Col. Alex Vorda
Bonanza: "A Ride in the Sun" (1969) – John Spain
Mannix: "Death in a Minor Key" (1969) – Chief Walt Finley
Mission: Impossible: "The Amateur" (1970) – Eric Schilling
Mission: Impossible: "The Connection" (1971) – Reece Dolan
Mannix: "Cry Silence" (1972) – James Conway
Cannon (1972, 1973) – three episodes
The Streets of San Francisco (1973) – Eddie Whitney
Kung Fu (1973 and 1974) – Rafe / Paul Klempt
Hawaii Five-O (1974) S6/Ep22 – Cord McKenzie in "Mother's Deadly Helper"
Harry O (1975–1976) Season 1 (after episode 14), Season 2 – Lt. KC Trench, 30 episodes
Once an Eagle (1976) – Dave Shifkin
How the West Was Won (1976–1977) – Martin Grey / Provost Marshal Captain Martin Grey
The Red Hand Gang (1977)
The Rockford Files: "The Gang at Don's Drive-In" (1978) – Jack Skowron
Centennial (1978) – Mervin Wendell
 Little House on the Prairie "The Wild Boy" (1982) - Dr. Joshua McQueen
George Washington (1984) – General St. Pierre
A.D. (miniseries) (1985) – Pontius Pilate
Highway to Heaven (1985) – Jabez Stone in "The Devil and Jonathan Smith"
Dream West (1986) – Bill Williams
One Police Plaza (1986)
North and South, Book II (1986) – Gen. Ulysses S. Grant
The Equalizer: "Memories of Manon" (1987) – Phillipe Marcel
Baja Oklahoma (1988) – Ole Jeemy Williams
Onassis: The Richest Man in the World (1988) – Livanos
Columbo: "Columbo Goes to the Guillotine" (1989) – Max Dyson
The Young Riders (1989–1992) – Teaspoon Hunter
Murder, She Wrote: "Murder of the Month Club" (1994) – Matt Matthews
Tales from the Crypt: "Revenge is the Nuts" (1994) - Arnie Grunwald
Walker Texas Ranger: "Break In" (1996) – Joey Galloway
Asteroid (1997) – Dr. Charles Napier
Frasier: "RDWRER" (2000) - Clifford
Judging Amy: "Accountability" (2004) – Judge Henry Sobel

References

External links

 
 
 

1936 births
Living people
20th-century American male actors
21st-century American male actors
American male film actors
American male stage actors
American male television actors
Male actors from Long Beach, California
Newport Harbor High School alumni
Outstanding Performance by a Supporting Actor in a Drama Series Primetime Emmy Award winners
Pomona College alumni
United States Air Force airmen